Kahal is a moshav in the Galilee near Highway 85 in northern Israel. Located on the border of the Upper Galilee and Lower Galilee, north of Lake Kinneret and just northwest of Tabgha, it falls under the jurisdiction of Mevo'ot HaHermon Regional Council.

References

Moshavim
Populated places in Northern District (Israel)
1980 establishments in Israel
Populated places established in 1980